Alan Walter Powell (7 January 1936 – 25 November 2020) was a historian and author of Northern Territory history.

Career

Alan Powell was the Dean of the Arts Faculty at the Northern Territory University, now Charles Darwin University, and later Emeritus Professor of History and Political Science at CDU.

He was the editor of the Journal of Northern Territory History. He also edited publications for the Historical Society of the Northern Territory.

In 2013 he was made a fellow of the Federation of Australian Historical Societies.

He was a charter member of the Rotary Club of Darwin Sunrise. Powell lived in Darwin, and was married with two daughters and one son.

Publications
 1977 – Patrician Democrat: The Political Life of Charles Cowper, 1843–1870
 1978 – John Lort Stokes and the crew of the Beagle
 1982 – Far Country: A Short History of the Northern Territory
 1986 – John Stokes and the Men of the Beagle: Discoverers of Port Darwin
 1988 – The Shadow's Edge: Australia's Northern War
 1995 – War by Stealth: Australians and the Allied Intelligence Bureau, 1942–1945
 2003 – The Third Force: Angau's New Guinea War 1942–1946
 2010 – Northern Voyages: Australia's Monsoon Coast in Maritime History
 2015 – Desert Country: A History of Newhaven
 2016 – Blood and Sand: Alyawarra and Cattlemen in the Sandover River Country
 2016 – World's End: British Military Outposts in the Ring Fence Around Australia 1842-1849
 2018 – Forgotten Country: A Short History of Central Australia

References

External links
 A celebration of Alan Powell at Northern Territory Library

1936 births
2020 deaths
Historians of Australia
Academic staff of Charles Darwin University
University of New England (Australia) alumni
New Zealand emigrants to Australia